Sounds That Can't Be Made is Marillion's 17th studio album, released on 17 September 2012. Besides the standard edition there is also a "deluxe campaign edition" containing a bonus DVD with a feature-length documentary called Making Sounds.

A 5.1 channel surround version of the album was released as part of the A Sunday Night Above the Rain Blu-ray set released on Racket Records in 2014.

Political activism 
The 17-minute opening track, "Gaza", is perhaps the most overtly political song Marillion have done since 1989. Its lyrics take the perspective of a boy growing up in the Israeli-occupied Gaza Strip. Singer Steve Hogarth explained, "This is a song for the people – especially the children – of Gaza. It was written after many conversations with ordinary Palestinians living in the refugee camps of Gaza and the West Bank. I spoke also to Israelis, to NGO workers, to a diplomat unofficially working in Jerusalem, and took their perspectives into account whilst writing the lyric. It is not my/our intention to smear the Jewish faith or people – we know many Jews are deeply critical of the current situation – and nothing here is intended to show sympathy for acts of violence, whatever the motivation, but simply to ponder upon where desperation inevitably leads. Many Gazan children are now the grandchildren of Palestinians BORN in the refugee camps - so called "temporary" shelters. Temporary for over 50 years now. Gaza is today, effectively, a city imprisoned without trial."

Like David Gilmour, Roger Waters, Chris Martin and others, Marillion support the "HOPING Foundation", an NGO that supports Palestinian children and adolescents in the refugee camps, and encourage their fans to do the same.

Promotional activities 
Like with several previous albums, Marillion used pre-ordering for Sounds That Can't Be Made to finance the album. In return, pre-order buyers received the special edition deluxe campaign edition box-set. The band had previously used the same approach successfully with the albums Anoraknophobia (2001), Marbles (2004) and Happiness Is the Road (2008).

Before the release of Sounds That Can't Be Made, two promotional songs were released on YouTube: "Power" on 17 July 2012 and "Gaza" on 4 September 2012.

Cover 
The cover was designed by Simon Ward. The artwork for the booklet was designed by five different artists, photographers and designers: Antonio Seijas, Simon Ward, Andy Wright, Marc Bessant and Carl Glover.

The binary data shown on the cover and the image on the box of the Deluxe Campaign Edition is taken from the Arecibo message.

Track listing 
All music written by Marillion, lyrics by Steve Hogarth except "Pour My Love" by John Helmer.

The deluxe campaign edition comes with a DVD that contains a full-length documentary about the making of the album, as well as numerous sound checks for songs on the album, and music videos for  'Lucky Man' and 'Power'. The deluxe edition, like the Marbles campaign edition, comes in a slipcase, and contains a 128-page booklet.

In November 2013 a Special Edition 2CD Digipack was released. This includes a bonus disc featuring 3 tracks recorded for RTL2 radio on 17 January 2013, 2 live tracks taken from the Racket Records release "A Sunday Night Above The Rain" recorded at the Marillion Weekend in Holland in 2013, and a demo version of 'Lucky Man', which can also be found on the "Unsound" disc included with the Blu-ray version of "A Sunday Night Above The Rain".

Track listing - Vinyl Edition 

After months of speculation on the official Marillion website, the album was finally released on a 33⅓ rpm double-vinyl LP in November 2013. The track listing was identical to the original CD release, although some copies included a manufacturers mistake whereby the labels of side 3 & 4 were stamped on the wrong sides of the actual vinyl discs. In other words, side 3 was actually side 4 and vice versa.

Side one
 "Gaza" – 17:31
Side two
 "Sounds That Can't Be Made" – 7:16
 "Pour My Love" – 6:02
 "Power" – 6:07
Side three
 "Montréal" – 14:04
 "Invisible Ink" – 5:47
Side four
 "Lucky Man" – 6:58
 "The Sky Above the Rain" – 10:34

Personnel

Band members 
Steve Hogarth – vocals, keyboards
Mark Kelly - keyboards, backing vocals
Ian Mosley - drums, backing vocals
Steve Rothery - guitars, backing vocals
Pete Trewavas - bass guitar, backing vocals, guitars

Charts

References 

Marillion albums
2012 albums